Pecos-Barstow-Toyah Independent School District is a public school district based in Pecos, Texas, United States.  In addition to Pecos, the district serves the town of Toyah in Reeves County and Barstow in western Ward County.  In 2009, the school district was rated "academically acceptable" by the Texas Education Agency.

Schools
 Pecos High (Grades 9-12)
 Crockett Middle (Grades 6-8)
 Bessie Haynes Elementary (Grades 4-5)
 Austin Elementary (Grades 1-3)
 Pecos Kindergarten (Grades PK-K)

References

External links
 

School districts in Reeves County, Texas
School districts in Ward County, Texas
Pecos, Texas